George Frederick Parry (8 December 1794 – 11 January 1872) was an English amateur cricketer who played first-class cricket from 1818 to 1829.

Parry was born at Tellicherry (now Thalassery), Kerala, India. Mainly associated with Marylebone Cricket Club (MCC) and Surrey, he made 16 known appearances in first-class matches.  He played for the Gentlemen in the Gentlemen v Players series.  He died in Mentone, Italy, aged 77.

References

External links
 CricketArchive profile

Further reading
 Arthur Haygarth, Scores & Biographies, Volumes 1-2 (1744-1840), Lillywhite, 1862

1794 births
1872 deaths
English cricketers
English cricketers of 1787 to 1825
English cricketers of 1826 to 1863
Marylebone Cricket Club cricketers
Gentlemen cricketers
Surrey cricketers
Non-international England cricketers
E. H. Budd's XI cricketers